Grigory Lukyanovich Skuratov-Belskiy, better known as Malyuta Skuratov (? – January 1, 1573) was one of the most odious leaders of the Oprichnina during the reign of Ivan the Terrible.

Biography

Malyuta Skuratov rose to prominence in 1569 for his role in the trial and execution of Prince Vladimir of Staritsa, Ivan IV's only cousin and a possible claimant to the throne of the Tsardom of Russia.

In December 1569, by order of Ivan the Terrible, Malyuta Skuratov strangled a former Metropolitan of Moscow,  Philip II (in office: 1566–1568) for his criticism of the Oprichnina.

In January 1571 Skuratov led a punitive expedition against Novgorod, killing thousands of its citizens on suspicion of treason. In 1571 Skuratov was put in charge of the investigation into the causes of the Russian army's defeat by the army of the Crimean Khan Devlet I Giray.

Malyuta Skuratov was killed during the siege of  Weissenstein (present-day Paide in Estonia) in the Livonian War in 1573. He lies buried near the grave of his father Lukian Afanasyevich Belskiy in the Joseph-Volokolamsk Monastery.

One of Skuratov's daughters, Maria Grigorievna, married the boyar Boris Godunov in 1570 and thus became Tsaritsa as the consort of Godunov in 1598. His other daughter, who poisoned Mikhail Skopin-Shuisky in 1610, married Prince Dmitry Ivanovich Skopin-Shuisky in 1572.

Media

Movies 
 Ivan the Terrible (1944/1958; portrayed by Mikhail Zharov)
 Tsar, a 2009 Russian drama film directed by Pavel Lungin.

Literature
 The Master and Margarita by Mikhail Bulgakov: in the chapter entitled "Satan's Great Ball", Bulgakov makes a passing but arguably important reference to the figure of Skuratov.

References

1573 deaths
16th-century Russian people
Executioners
Tsardom of Russia people
Russian military personnel killed in action
Year of birth unknown
Russian nobility